Lars Fredrik Svanberg (13 May 1805 – 16 July 1878) was a Swedish chemist and mineralogist.

Life 

He was born on 13 May 1805 in Stockholm, Sweden, as the son of Jöns Svanberg. He was married twice. In 1836, he married Augusta Roth and in 1859, Baroness Frederica Augusta Stiernstedt. He died on 16 July 1878 in Uppsala, Sweden.

Career 

He was a student of Jöns Jacob Berzelius. From 1853 to 1874, he was the professor of chemistry at Uppsala University.

In 1839, he became a member of the Royal Swedish Academy of Sciences.

He also had a military career, and was appointed second lieutenant in the Swedish Navy Mechanical Corps. His duties were the quality control of cannon and iron produced for the Swedish Navy.

Honours 

The mineral Svanbergite is named after him.

References

External links 
 http://runeberg.org/sbh/svanblar.html

1805 births
1878 deaths
Swedish chemists
Swedish mineralogists
Academic staff of Uppsala University
Members of the Royal Swedish Academy of Sciences
Swedish Navy officers
19th-century Swedish military personnel
Burials at Uppsala old cemetery